Statistics of Primera División Uruguaya for the 1996 season.

Overview
It was contested by 12 teams, and Peñarol won the championship.

Apertura

Clausura

Overall

Playoff
Peñarol 1-0 ; 1-1 Nacional
Peñarol won the championship.

References
Uruguay - List of final tables (RSSSF)

Uruguayan Primera División seasons
1996 in Uruguayan football
Uru